Lake Chivero is a reservoir on the Manyame River in Zimbabwe. It was formerly called Lake McIlwaine in memory of Sir Robert McIlwaine, a former judge of the High Court and founder of Southern Rhodesia's (later Rhodesia's, now Zimbabwe's) soil and water conservation movement.

Located southwest of Harare, it provides the main water supply for the city. The lake was constructed over two-and-a-half years and opened to the public in 1952. The dam wall is 400 metres long.

The water is also used for irrigation purposes and commercial fishing. Some of the fishes that are found in the lake include common grass carp, tigerfish, black bream, Clarias gariepinus, yellowfish, and green-headed bream.

The lake and hinterland are protected as part of Lake Chivero Recreational Park. The lake was designated a Ramsar wetland of international importance on 3 January 2013.

Remembrance Island is a small island in the reservoir.

See also
Lake Chivero Recreational Park

References

Chivero
Harare
Geography of Mashonaland West Province
Zvimba District
Ramsar sites in Zimbabwe